In 2012, following the disappointing results of previous years, the Chiefs underwent a significant change in personnel. This included the recruitment of new coaches, including Dave Rennie and Wayne Smith, and players, including Aaron Cruden, Ben Tameifuna, Brodie Retallick and Sonny Bill Williams. The changes had an immediate impact as the Chiefs finished at the top of the New Zealand conference, qualifying for a home semi-final, which they won, defeating the  20–17. They also set many club records in the 2012 season, including: most home wins, best home streak, best season winning streak, and most points and tries scored.

Standings

The final standings of the 2012 Super Rugby season were:

Results

The results of the Chiefs during the 2012 Super Rugby season were:

Squad

The Chiefs squad for the 2012 Super Rugby season were:

Player statistics

The Chiefs players' appearance and scoring statistics for the 2012 Super Rugby season are:

Notes and references

External links
Official Chiefs website
Official Super Rugby website 
Official Facebook page

2012
2012 in New Zealand rugby union
2012 Super Rugby season by team